U.S. Route 50 (US-50) is a major east–west route of the U.S. Highway system, stretching just over  from Interstate 80 (I-80) in West Sacramento, California, to Maryland Route 528 (MD 528) in Ocean City, Maryland, on the Atlantic Ocean. In the U.S. state of Kansas, US-50 is a main east–west highway serving the southwest, central and northeastern parts of the state.  Kansas City is the only metropolitan area US-50 serves in the state but the highway does serve several other larger towns in Kansas such as (from west to east) Garden City, Dodge City, Hutchinson, Newton and Emporia.

US-50 was established in Kansas by 1927, and at that time split into two branch routes in Kansas. The US-50 split began in Garden City and ended slightly west of Baldwin City. In Garden City, the split began at Kansas Avenue and Main Street. US-50N continued east on Kansas Ave. and went through Jetmore, Larned, Great Bend, Lyons, McPherson and Baldwin City. US-50S ran along current US-50. The routes rejoined near what is now the intersection of US-56 and K-33. US-50N was replaced by US-156 from Garden City to Great Bend and US-56 the rest of the way. US-156 is now known as K-156. The split was removed during the late 1950s.

Route description
US-50 enters the state running concurrently with US-400, which joins US-50 at Granada, Colorado. The first town it runs through is Coolidge. Syracuse is the first county seat (Hamilton County).  In western Kansas, US-50 parallels the Arkansas River.

US-50 then enters Kearny County and passes through the towns of Lakin and Deerfield before entering Finney County. West of the Old US-50 and Big Lowe Road overpass in Holcomb US-50 splits into four lanes and the speed limit increases to 70 MPH until east of the intersection with US-83. The highway then tapers back into two lanes at the 3rd Street intersection and remains so until the intersection with Bus-50 south of town. US-50 then passes through the towns of Ingalls, Cimarron, Dodge City, Kinsley, and Hutchinson before it heads to Newton. In Newton, US-50 joins I-135 for a short time before it angles northeast to Emporia, another meat-packing town as well as the home of Emporia State University. US-50 then joins I-35 and it overlaps that interstate for most of the rest of the way in Kansas.

US-50, along with I-35, then passes through a place known as "BETO Junction," which is where it meets US-75 north of Burlington. The letters in the acronym stand for Burlington, Emporia, Topeka and Ottawa, which are the cities to the south, west, north and east, respectively.

From there, US-50 passes through Olathe and meets I-435 in Lenexa. At this point. US-50 leaves I-35 and joins I-435 for the rest of its trip in Kansas.

The entire  section of US-50 in Cimarron is maintained by the city. The entire 1.662 section within Dodge City is maintained by the city. The section in Emporia from Graphic Arts Road to the east city limit is maintained by the city.

History

US-50 was established in Kansas by 1927, and at that time split into two branch routes. Branch routes were once common along the U.S. highway system but have always been discouraged. Branch routes that remain exist mostly in Kentucky and Tennessee. The US-50 split began in Garden City and ended near Baldwin City. In Garden City, the split began at Kansas Avenue and Main Street. US-50N continued east on Kansas Ave. and went through Jetmore, Larned, Great Bend, Lyons, McPherson and Baldwin City. US-50S ran along current US-50. The routes rejoined near what is now the intersection of US-56 and K-33.

The first route considered for US-56 was via US-40 from Ellsworth to Topeka and K-4 and US-59 via Atchison to St. Joseph, Missouri. A revised route adopted in March 1955, due to AASHO objections to the original route, which traveled concurrently with other U.S. Highways for over half of its length, followed K-14, K-18, US-24, K-63, K-16, and US-59 via Lincoln and Manhattan. In July 1955, the US-50N Association proposed a plan that would have eliminated US-50N by routing US 56 along most of its length, from Larned east to Baldwin Junction, and then along US-59 to Lawrence and K-10 to Kansas City; towns on US-50N west of Larned, which would have been bypassed, led a successful fight against this. However, in September of that year, the Kansas Highway Commission accepted that plan, taking US-56 east to Kansas City. On June 27, 1956, the AASHO Route Numbering Committee considered this refined plan for US-56, between Springer, New Mexico and Kansas City, Missouri, with a short US-156 along the remaining portion of US-50N from Larned west to Garden City. The entirety of US-156 was decommissioned on April 1, 1981, and redesignated as K-156.

In mid 2019, work began to convert the junction with US-281 to an enhanced roundabout. The roundabout includes outer diamond shape lanes for oversized loads to bypass the roundabout. The former intersection with US-281 was dangerous as only US-281 traffic had to stop and therefore was the location of several injury and fatal accidents. Between 2002 and 2012, there were 21 accidents, resulting in one fatality. On March 4, 2020, traffic was rerouted, from a four-way stop and temporary asphalt detour, onto the permanent concrete outer roads for the roundabout. The roundabout was completed and opened up to traffic on May 22, 2020. Venture Corporation from Great Bend, was the primary contractor for the $5.2 million project.

On July 20, 2020 work began on a project to reconstruct US-50 from Road E5 to a half mile east of Road F in Lyon County. The project will widen the highway to 4-lanes for one mile. Improvements also will be made at the Road E5 and Road F intersections. Koss Construction Company of Topeka is the primary contractor of the $7.8 million project.

Future
In May 2020, KDOT's Eisenhower Legacy Transportation Plan was announced. One project included in the statewide plan will complete the 4-lane expressway between Garden City and Dodge City.

Junction list

Special routes
In Garden City. US-50 and US-83 each have business routes. They both start at the same place, at the junction of US-50, 83 and 400 about one mile (1.6 km) north of town. They run concurrently along the former alignments of US-50 and 83 through town to the intersection of Main Street and Fulton Street. At that point, the business routes split and Business 50 heads east to meet up with US-50, 83 and 400 east of town.

US-50 once had alternate routings in Garden City and Dodge City and business routes in Dodge City and Ottawa. Former Alternate 50 in Garden City is now known as Campus Drive. Its purpose was to connect US-50 travelers to then-US-156 without having to go all the way into downtown. Its purpose was taken over by Spur US-83 in the 1970s. Spur US-83 is now the bypass around Garden City that carries highways 50, 83 and 400.

Former Alternate 50 at Dodge City is now the main route for US-50. Business 50 in Dodge City was decommissioned when the US-400 bypass was built to the south and west of that city. Business 50 in Ottawa ran along the former US-50 alignment through Ottawa.

References

External links

 Kansas Highway Maps: Current, Historic, KDOT
 1926 US Highway Map, Department of Agriculture

50
 Kansas
Transportation in Hamilton County, Kansas
Transportation in Kearny County, Kansas
Transportation in Finney County, Kansas
Transportation in Gray County, Kansas
Transportation in Ford County, Kansas
Transportation in Edwards County, Kansas
Transportation in Stafford County, Kansas
Transportation in Reno County, Kansas
Transportation in Harvey County, Kansas
Transportation in Marion County, Kansas
Transportation in Chase County, Kansas
Transportation in Lyon County, Kansas
Transportation in Coffey County, Kansas
Transportation in Osage County, Kansas
Transportation in Franklin County, Kansas
Transportation in Johnson County, Kansas